Knapp may refer to:

People 
 Knapp (surname)

Places 
 Knapp, Dunn County, Wisconsin
 Knapp, Jackson County, Wisconsin
 Knapp, Hampshire, England, a village in the parish of Ampfield
 Knapp, Perthshire, Scotland
 Knapp Creek (West Virginia), Pocahontas County, West Virginia
 Knapp's Castle, Santa Barbara County, California

Companies 
 Bill Knapp's, a defunct restaurant chain in Michigan
 Knapp's, a defunct department store chain in Michigan

Other 
 Knapp Commission, a far-reaching investigation, named for its chairman Whitman Knapp, into corruption in the NYPD from 1970 to 1972
 USS Knapp (DD-653), United States Navy destroyer
 Komitet Narodowy Amerykanów Polskiego Pochodzenia (KNAPP), the National Committee of Americans of Polish Extraction (1942-1959)